Bright Size Life is the debut album by Pat Metheny, released in 1976 on ECM. The album features Jaco Pastorius on bass and Bob Moses on drums.

In 2020, the album was deemed "culturally, historically, or aesthetically significant" by the Library of Congress and selected for preservation in the National Recording Registry.

Production and reception 
The songs for Bright Size Life were written when Metheny was living in Boston and teaching at the Berklee School of Music. Metheny's mentor, the vibraphonist Gary Burton, helped Metheny arrange the songs and accompanied him to the recording session in Germany. Despite that, Burton never received a producer credit on the release.

Metheny has described the album as being "moderately successful" when it was released, selling around 900 copies, but that it wasn't until 10–15 years later that it received wider recognition.

In 2005, the first track was included on the Progressions: 100 Years of Jazz Guitar compilation on Columbia Records. In 2011, the first track was included on the Jazz: The Smithsonian Anthology compilation. In August 2020, the album was included in the jazzwise list of 100 Jazz Albums That Shook the World.

Track listing

Personnel
 Pat Metheny – 6-and 12-string electric guitar
 Jaco Pastorius –  bass guitar
 Bob Moses – drums

Charts
Album – Billboard

References

Pat Metheny albums
1976 debut albums
ECM Records albums
Albums produced by Manfred Eicher
United States National Recording Registry recordings
United States National Recording Registry albums